Gatas can refer to:
 Gatas (Ponce), a Puerto Rican island off the southern coast of Puerto Rico in the municipality of Ponce
 Gatas Brilhantes H.P., a Japanese futsal club
 Gatas Parlament (Parliament of the Street), a Norwegian group of rap artists
 Baía das Gatas, a bay in  São Vicente Island, Cape Verde
 Praia das Gatas, a beach in  Boa Vista Island, Cape Verde
 Ongaku Gatas, a Japanese girl group

See also
 Gata (disambiguation)